Jalan Mambong–Sejingkat, Sarawak State Route 13, is a major highway in Kuching and Samarahan Division, Sarawak, Malaysia.

List of interchanges and intersections

Highways in Malaysia
Malaysian Federal Roads